The 1966 NAIA football season was the eleventh season of college football sponsored by the NAIA.

The season was played from August to November 1966, culminating in the 1966 NAIA Championship Bowl, played this year on December 10, 1966 in Tulsa, Oklahoma.

Waynesburg defeated Whitewater State in the Championship Bowl, 42–21, to win their first NAIA national title.

Conference standings

Postseason

Bracket

Championship game outstanding players
Back: Rich Dahar, Waynesburg
Lineman: Dennis Williamson, Whitewater State

See also
 1966 NCAA University Division football season
 1966 NCAA College Division football season

References

 
NAIA Football National Championship